Mishawaka (YTB‑764) was a United States Navy  named for Mishawaka, Indiana.

Construction
She was laid down on 1 February 1962 at Slidell, Louisiana, by Southern Shipbuilding Corporation and launched 3 January 1963.

Operational history
She reported for duty in the 11th Naval District, headquartered at San Diego, in April 1963, where she remained into the 1980s.

Stricken from the Navy Directory 28 October 2002, ex-Mishawaka was sold by the Defense Reutilization and Marketing Service (DRMS) to JE Ventures LP, Nederland, Texas, for commercial service.  Renamed Alois. In 2008, Alois was reported abandoned in Harlingen, Netherlands. At Harlingen, Alois was seized by court order and auctioned off by the International Transport Workers' Federation, for 400,000. In 2010 the ship was towed from Rotterdam to Port Arthur, TX, where she was berthed, awaiting sale by the bank.

References

External links
 

Natick-class large harbor tugs
1963 ships
Ships built in Slidell, Louisiana